Hebrew Academy may refer to:

Organisations
 The Academy of the Hebrew Language, Hebrew language regulator
 Hebrew Academy for Special Children, non-profit organization

Education

Canada
 Hebrew Academy, Jewish day school in Montreal, Quebec
 Tanenbaum Community Hebrew Academy of Toronto, high school in Toronto, Ontario
 Vancouver Hebrew Academy, Jewish day school in Vancouver, British Columbia

United States
 American Hebrew Academy, Jewish preparatory school in Greensboro, North Carolina
 Epstein Hebrew Academy, Jewish day school in Olivette, Missouri
 Greenfield Hebrew Academy, Jewish day school in Atlanta, Georgia
 Hebrew Academy of Cleveland, Jewish day school in Cleveland, Ohio
 Hebrew Academy of Long Beach, Jewish day school in Long Beach, New York
 Hebrew Academy of Nassau County, Jewish high school in Nassau County, New York
 Hebrew Academy of San Francisco, also known as Lisa Kampner Hebrew Academy, Jewish day school in San Francisco, California
 Hebrew Academy of the Five Towns and Rockaway, Jewish day school in Lawrence, New York
 Hebrew Academy of Tidewater, elementary school in Virginia Beach, Virginia
 Hebrew Language Academy Charter School, charter school in Brooklyn, New York
 Hyman Brand Hebrew Academy, Jewish day school in Overland Park, Kansas
 Jack M. Barrack Hebrew Academy, Jewish day school in Bryn Mawr, Pennsylvania
 Joseph Kushner Hebrew Academy, yeshiva day school in Livingston, New Jersey
 Phoenix Hebrew Academy, Jewish day school in Phoenix, Arizona
 Politz Hebrew Academy, Jewish school in Philadelphia, Pennsylvania
 Rabbi Alexander S. Gross Hebrew Academy, Jewish high school in Miami, Florida
 Seattle Hebrew Academy, Jewish day school in Seattle, Washington
 Margolin Hebrew Academy, Jewish day school in Memphis, Tennessee
 Melvin J. Berman Hebrew Academy, Jewish day school in Rockville, Maryland
 North Shore Hebrew Academy, yeshiva in  Great Neck, New York 
 Tucson Hebrew Academy, Jewish day school in Tucson, Arizona                                                                                                                                

Jewish schools